Candida bracarensis is an anamorphic yeast species with type strain 153MT (=CBS 10154T =NCYC D3853T =CECT 12000T).

References

Further reading

bracarensis
Yeasts
Fungi described in 1999